The Memphis Tigers men's soccer team is a varsity intercollegiate athletic team of the University of Memphis in Memphis, Tennessee, United States. The team is an associate member of The American Athletic Conference, which is part of the National Collegiate Athletic Association's Division I. Memphis's first men's soccer team was fielded in 1982. The team is coached by Richard Mulrooney and play their home games at the on-campus soccer & track stadium.

Individual achievements

All-Americans

All-Region

References

External links 
 

 
1982 establishments in Tennessee
Association football clubs established in 1982